Rafael Carballo (born 16 October 1981) is an Argentine rugby union footballer who plays at wing or centre for Bordeaux in the Top 14. He has also represented the Argentina national rugby union team.

External links
Rafael Carballo Official Website
Rafael Carballo at scrum.com
Profile at uar.com.ar (in Spanish)

1981 births
Living people
Argentine rugby union players
Argentina international rugby union players
Rugby union centres
Rugby union wings
RC Toulonnais players
Rugby union players from Buenos Aires
Argentine expatriate rugby union players
Expatriate rugby union players in France
Argentine expatriate sportspeople in France
Union Bordeaux Bègles players
Asociación Alumni players